This is a list of Swedish submarines since 1904.

Active service

 (1992-1997)
 
 
 

 (1983-1990)
 
 

 (2003-2004)
  - previous Västergötland class
  - previous Västergötland class

Deep Submergence Rescue Vehicle
URF

Decommissioned

  (S), stricken 1936, broken up 1946
  (T), stricken 1936, broken up 1946

 , stricken 1935
 , stricken 1931

 , stricken 1937
 , stricken 1937

 , stricken 1943, broken up 1944
 , stricken 1942, broken up 1946
 , stricken 1943, broken up 1944

 , stricken 1944, broken up 1956
 , sunk 1943, salvaged, broken up 1944
 , stricken 1944, broken up

 , stricken 1944

 , stricken 1948
 , stricken 1947
 , stricken 1943

Delfinen class
 , sold 1957, broken up
 , sold 1958, broken up
 , sold 1956, broken up

 , stricken 1959
 , stricken 1964
 , stricken 1960
 , stricken 1959
 , stricken 1964
 , stricken 1959
 , stricken 1963
 , stricken 1964
 , stricken 1959

 , stricken 1966
 , stricken 1966
 , stricken 1966

 (1941-1944)
 , stricken 1960
 , stricken 1960
 , stricken 1964
  - rebuilt as the attack submarine HMS Forellen, stricken 1970
  - rebuilt as the attack submarine HMS Aborren, stricken 1976
  - rebuilt as the attack submarine HMS Siken, stricken 1975
  - rebuilt as the attack submarine HMS Gäddan, stricken 1973
  - rebuilt as the attack submarine HMS Laxen, stricken 1976
  - rebuilt as the attack submarine HMS Makrillen, stricken 1976

 (1954-1958)
 
  
 
 
 
 

 (1960-1961)
 
 
 
 
 
 

 (1967-1968)
 
 
 
 
 

 (1978-1979)

Other
 , stricken 1922
 , sunk as target 1924
 , stricken 1930

External links

Submarines of Sweden
Submarines of the Swedish Navy
Submarines
Submarines